Tokkō or Tokko may refer to:
 Tokkō (特攻), short for Tokubetsu Kōgekitai (literally: "Special Attack Unit"), the official name for Japanese aviators conducting kamikaze attacks in World War II
 Tokkō (特高), short for Tokubetsu Kōtō Keisatsu (literally: "Special Higher Police"), the Japanese secret police which existed from 1911 to 1945
 Tokko (manga) (特公), short for Tokushu Kōanbu, a manga series
 Tokko (river), a river in the Sakha Republic (Yakutia)
 Tokko, Russia, a selo (village) in Zharkhansky National Nasleg of the Olyokminsky District of the Sakha Republic

See also

Tonko